The 2009 Tour du Grand Montréal was the 8th and last edition of the Tour du Grand Montréal, a women's cycling stage race in Canada. It was rated by the UCI as a category 2.1 race and was held between 1 and 4 June 2009.

Stages

Stage 1
1 June 2009 – Châteauguay to Châteauguay,

Stage 2
2 June 2009 – Granby to Granby,

Stage 3
3 June 2009 – Lachine to Lachine (individual time trial),

Stage 4
3 June 2009 – Montreal (criterium),

Stage 5
4 June 2009 – Mont-Saint-Hilaire to Mont-Saint-Hilaire,

Final classification

Source

See also
 2009 in women's road cycling

References

External links

2009 in women's road cycling
Tour du Grand Montréal
2009 in Canadian sports
2009 in Quebec